The Alfa Romeo Racing C38 is a Formula One racing car designed and constructed by Alfa Romeo Racing to compete during the 2019 Formula One World Championship. It is the first Sauber-engineered car to be badged Alfa Romeo following a team renaming deal struck with Sauber Motorsport AG in February 2019. It was Alfa Romeo's first season as a F1 team since 1985. The car was driven by Kimi Räikkönen and Antonio Giovinazzi, and made its debut at the 2019 Australian Grand Prix. The car finished 8th in the Constructors' Championship with 57 points, 43 for Räikkönen and 14 for Giovinazzi.

The chassis was designed by Simone Resta, Luca Furbatto, Ian Wright, Jan Monchaux and Nicolas Hennel with the car being powered with a customer Ferrari powertrain.

Technical details 
The C38's engine is a 1600cc V6 engine, with a single turbocharger. The Energy Recovery System (ERS) is accumulated into a battery pack and deployed via a 120 kW electric motor. The C38 has an 8-speed gearbox, 6-piston Brembo brake callipers, and carbon-composite discs and pads from Carbon Industries. The chassis is a carbon-composite monocoque; the front suspension has double wishbones, with inboard spring and damper units actuated by push-rods; the rear suspension is Multilink, with inboard spring and damper elements actuated by pull-rods. The C38 has OZ wheels and Pirelli tyres.

Competition history 
At the opening race in Australia, Räikkönen and Giovinazzi qualified 9th and 14th respectively. Giovinazzi would go on to finish 15th, whilst Räikkönen finished 8th, scoring Alfa Romeo's first points in Formula One since the 1984 European Grand Prix. Räikkönen went on to score three more consecutive points finishes, including 7th in Bahrain and 9th in China. In Azerbaijan Räikkönen's car failed a front wing deflection test, excluding him from qualifying and forcing him to start the race from the pit lane. An impressive recovery drive saw him finish 10th. A brief dip in fortunes followed as the team failed to score points in the next three races, the best finish being 13th place for Giovinazzi in Canada. A particularly poor showing came in Monaco, after Giovinazzi was penalised for causing a collision and would go on to finish the race in 19th place, whilst Räikkönen could only salvage 17th. 

The C38 returned to form in France where Räikkönen recorded another 7th-place finish, albeit with Giovinazzi a lowly 16th. The car achieved its first double points-finish of the season in Austria, where Räikkönen and Giovinazzi finished 9th and 10th respectively. This also marked the first point of Giovinazzi's Formula One career. The C38's first retirement of the season came at the following race in Britain, where Giovinazzi spun into a gravel trap after suffering a mechanical failure whilst running in 9th place. Räikkönen went on to score another points-finish with 8th place. At the German Grand Prix, the team recorded their best grid position of the season with Räikkönen qualifying 5th. During the rain-affected race, the C38 achieved its best combined finish of the season thus far when Räikkönen and Giovinazzi finished 7th and 8th respectively. However, after the race, the stewards found that the team had used a type of traction control during the race start, providing the drivers with an illegal advantage in the wet conditions. Both drivers were issued with 30-second time penalties, demoting them to 12th and 13th. Alfa Romeo later appealed the decision, however this appeal was rejected.

In Hungary, Giovinazzi started 17th after receiving a grid penalty for impeding another driver in qualifying. He failed to recover during the race and finished 18th, meanwhile Räikkönen scored another points-finish with 7th place. In Belgium, Räikkönen was involved in a first-lap collision and suffered a slow pit-stop when his front wing was replaced, eventually finishing 16th. Giovinazzi crashed out on the penultimate lap having been running in 9th place. In Italy, Räikkönen crashed heavily in qualifying, forcing him to start the race from the pit lane after damaged power unit components were replaced. He would only recover to 15th place by the end of the race. Giovinazzi scored a career best and second points-finish with 9th place. The C38 became the first Alfa Romeo Formula One car to lead a Grand Prix lap since the 1983 183T when Giovinazzi led the Singapore Grand Prix for four laps. He would go on to finish 10th. Meanwhile, Räikkönen was involved in a collision with Daniil Kvyat, breaking his suspension and forcing him to retire.

The C38 struggled at the next four races, failing to score points. Räikkönen's car retired from the Mexican Grand Prix with an overheating issue, and both cars were knocked out in Q1 in the United States. A successful result came at the chaotic Brazilian Grand Prix. Both drivers took advantage of retirements, collisions and penalties of cars ahead to score the C38's best result, with Räikkönen classified 4th and Giovinazzi 5th. The car returned to poor form at the season-ending Abu Dhabi Grand Prix, with both drivers failing to reach Q2 and to score points.

Complete Formula One results
(key)

 Driver failed to finish the race, but was classified as they had completed over 90% of the winner's race distance.

References

C38
2019 Formula One season cars